is a Japanese anime television series based on the Bleach manga series by Tite Kubo and a direct sequel to the Bleach anime series. In March 2020, Weekly Shōnen Jump and "Bleach 20th Anniversary Project & Tite Kubo New Project Presentation" livestream announced that the manga's last story arc, "Thousand-Year Blood War", would receive an anime project. In November 2020, it was announced that the anime project would be a television series. The trailer and visual for the series were revealed at the Jump Festa '22 on December 18, 2021. 

The series is directed by Tomohisa Taguchi and premiered on TV Tokyo on October 11, 2022. The series will run for four cours with breaks in between. The first cour, The Thousand-Year Blood War, consists of 13 episodes and ended on December 27 of the same year. The second cour, subtitled The Separation, will begin airing in July 2023.

 performed the opening theme , while SennaRin performed the ending theme ; In addition, Kitani also performed the special ending theme for the first episode, "Rapport", which was previously used as the main theme song for the series' 20th Anniversary Exhibition, Bleach EX.

On October 3, 2022, Viz Media announced that the series would stream on Hulu in the United States and Disney+ internationally outside of Asia; Viz Media's English dub of the series began streaming on Hulu on November 4 of the same year.



Episode list

Home media release

Japanese

Notes

References

External links
  
 

Thousand-Year Blood War
2022 Japanese television seasons